Muldu is a rural locality in the Toowoomba Region, Queensland, Australia.

History 
Muldu is an Aboriginal word, meaning "shade". It was originally assigned to the Muldu railway station by the Queensland Railways Department on 24 November 1911.

Muldu State School opened on 3 September 1917 and closed in 1966.

In the  Muldu had a population of three.

References 

Toowoomba Region
Localities in Queensland